is a professional Japanese baseball player. He plays catcher for the Hanshin Tigers.

External links

 NPB.com

1993 births
Living people
Baseball people from Hyōgo Prefecture
Meiji University alumni
Japanese baseball players
Nippon Professional Baseball catchers
Hanshin Tigers players